TVBully refers to the monopolistic market dominance of free-to-air television in Hong Kong. Television Broadcasts Limited (TVB) was blamed for this monopolization and this phenomenon had been a huge challenge for the operation of TVB. ATV has also complained about TVB's monopoly abuse.

The term TVBully was created by Hong Kong citizens, using the name of the television station "TVB" in the beginning, adding "Bully" at the end of the term. The low quality of programmes are one of the main reasons of the complains.

Background 

The free-to-air television services in Hong Kong began with Television Broadcasts (TVB) in November 19, 1967. The second free-to-air broadcaster Asia Television (ATV) launched as Rediffusion Television (RTV) in December 1, 1973.
 
The brilliant time of the market is in the 1970s to 1980s, with the launch of the third broadcaster, Commercial Television (CTV). It first went on air on September 9, 1975 but ceased transmissions on August 22, 1978 due to financial pressure.

In the 1990s, ATV was unable to recover from setbacks due to a variety number of internal operation problems. The Chief Executive in Council rejected the license renewal application of ATV on April 1, 2015, and ATV ceased transmissions on April 1, 2016.

The closure of CTV and having the lower hand of ATV probably helps TVB to gain the greatest market share for over 48 years. Indeed, TVB channels captured an overall 81% audience share against all TV channels in Hong Kong during weekday primetime. According to CSM Media Research, TVB Pearl gained over 90% share in 2012 by comparing with its one and the only competitor, ATV World.
                                                                                                                                              
However, in the 2010s, many Hong Kongers are unsatisfied with the current television services. Many have discontented towards the monopoly structure probably leads to deteriorate the quality of programmes of TVB, the main programmes producer in Hong Kong, which is superficial and usual, undiversified programmes choice and monopolized the resources in the cultural industry. Some netizens organized an internet concern group, which held activities to express their discontents, such as the "switch-off incident" of "TVB Anniversary 2013".

Cause 

The cause of monopolization of TVB has been probably found that restriction of issuing the license is the main reason resulting this phenomenon. In 1965, the government aimed to issue one license of operating free-to-air analog television broadcasting service and six tycoon groups such as Shaw Brothers (HK) Ltd. and Fuji Television of Japan were attracted to bid. Ultimately, the license was granted to Television Broadcasts Limited (TVB) and the service commenced in 1967. In the other words, access of market of competitive companies which produced similar products with TVB were limited by the Authority's policy.

In 1972, Rediffusion obtained the second license to operate the analog television. There was a great competition between TVB, Rediffusion and Commercial Television in 70s to 80s. Because of the rapid development of Commercial Television and headhunting by Rediffusion, TVB confronted with various challenges including turnover of staff and cancellation of programs. However, TVB maintained its competitive edge during the period whereas other two had declined in broadcast popularity or one of them even closed down within three years. This situation and popularity of TVB resulted in TV viewing habit of Hong Kong citizens and the market position of TVB was difficult to be altered.

Effects

Deteriorating Quality of Programmes 

TVB has been accused of producing programs of low quality in the recent decades. In the Reports of public consultation on the services of free-to-air broadcasters released by the Communications Authority in 2015, most of the attended public reflected that the programs from TVB are being deficient in quality as a tendency and some of them are even below acceptable standard because of lacking competition. For example, some audiences discontent the mistakes, which can be easily spotted within a soap opera due to the scarce research done on the show, because TVB is not necessary to focus on programmes quality as she is the monopolist. Also, some reflected that it is condemned to have the same background setting and actors are repeated among many different shows in which the audiences thought that TVB lacks of sincerity in terms of the use of resources.

Moreover, the Report stated that TVB is perceived copying the ideas from other countries instead of creating their own ones, not to mention its lack of creativity that, for instance, the "Super Trio Series" had been broadcast from 1995 till 2014 without changing most of the elements in the show.

According to a HKU POP survey released in 2013, a slight decline is shown on the appreciation index of the TV program provided by TVB, which implies that there may be need to retain the dropping quality of the TV program.

Affecting the Development of Hong Kong Cultural Industry 

The monopoly power of TVB inhabits and affects the development of Hong Kong Cultural Industry such as Performing Arts Industry, Music Industry and Television Industry.  By December 2009, the Communications Authority launched an investigation into TVB after rival ATV's complaint, alleging that TVB had violated the Broadcasting Ordinance. TVB was then fined HK$900,000 by the city's communications watchdog for engaging in anti-competition practices including "harsh and unreasonable" terms in contracts with some singers and artistes, and a "No Cantonese Policy" that prohibits contract artistes from speaking Cantonese on other Hong Kong TV stations’ programmes.  
    	
On June 12, 2014, the Communications Authority received Hong Kong Television Network (HKTVN)'s complaint against TVB, alleging that TVB had executed in anti-competition conduct by abusing trade mark law and procedures to prevent HKTVN from obtaining a domestic free-to-air television programme services licence ("FTV licence") in order to strengthen TVB's dominance in Hong Kong television programme service market.
 
Meanwhile, due to dominance, the quality of the product of TVB declines with times. The exporting local series production line once being hot in 70s to 80s such as Hong Hei Gun, was then closed down which greatly affects the development of Performing Arts Industry, Television Industry and Cultural Industry in Hong Kong.

See also
 2010 TVB monopoly case
 TVB
 Television in Hong Kong
 Television Broadcasts
 Asia Television
 Commercial Television
 Communications Authority
 List of television stations in Hong Kong

References

Television in Hong Kong